David John Green (18 December 1935 – 12 May 2020) was an English first-class cricketer who played for Derbyshire between 1953 and 1960 and for Cambridge University from 1957 to 1959.

Cricket career
Green was born in Burton-on-Trent and educated at Burton Grammar School before going up to Christ's College, Cambridge. His first County Championship appearances for Derbyshire came at the age of 17 during the 1953 season. He remained a force in the middle order in the 1954 season, and following an impressive display against Kent, was selected to play for Derbyshire against the touring Pakistanis.

He appeared occasionally throughout the 1955 season and made a strong finish to 1956. He then went to Cambridge University and  he spent the following spring playing for the university making impressive showings against County Cricket teams before resuming his role as a Derbyshire player later in the 1957 season. This pattern was repeated in  1958, although he made no appearances for Derbyshire during 1959. He played for Cambridge in the Varsity match in 1957, 1958 and 1959.

Green returned briefly for Derbyshire in the 1960 season, and played for Free Foresters in 1960 and 1961 against Cambridge University. He also played for Derbyshire's Second XI in the Minor Counties Championship and the Second XI Championship. In 1964 he played a one-day match for Wiltshire.

References

External links
 

1935 births
2020 deaths
Sportspeople from Burton upon Trent
Alumni of Christ's College, Cambridge
English cricketers
Derbyshire cricketers
Cambridge University cricketers
Wiltshire cricketers
Free Foresters cricketers
Combined Services cricketers